Gasmata Airport  is an airfield in Gasmata in the West New Britain Province of Papua New Guinea.

Facilities

Airlines and destinations
Tropicair

References

External links
 

Airports in Papua New Guinea
West New Britain Province